Spiess Glacier is a glacier about 8 nautical miles (15 km) long on Merz Peninsula, flowing north into a small bay east of Hjort Massif on the south side of Hilton Inlet, Black Coast. Mapped by the United States Geological Survey (USGS) from aerial photographs taken by the U.S. Navy, 1966–69. Surveyed by British Antarctic Survey (BAS), 1974–75. In association with the names of Antarctic oceanographers grouped in this area, named by the United Kingdom Antarctic Place-Names Committee (UK-APC) in 1977 after Captain (later V. Adm.) Fritz A. Spiess (1881-1959), of the German Navy, Commander and Scientific Chief of the German Atlantic Expedition in Meteor, 1925–27, after the death of Professor Alfred Merz.

Glaciers of Palmer Land